Polar Opposite is the sixth EP by the Australian rock band Sick Puppies. It features acoustic versions of many of their most well-known songs, including "All the Same". The EP was released on 1 March 2011.

Track listing

Personnel
 Shim Moore – lead vocals, lead guitar
 Emma Anzai – bass, backing vocals, lead vocals on "White Balloons"
 Mark Goodwin – drums

References

Sick Puppies albums
2011 EPs
Albums produced by Rock Mafia
Virgin Records EPs